Bunsen Is a Beast is an American animated television series created by Butch Hartman for Nickelodeon. It revolves around a small eccentric monster named Bunsen who begins attending a middle school that previously only admitted humans. In spite of prejudice against beasts, Bunsen befriends a human boy named Mikey Munroe and his homeschooled companion, Darcy. Together, Bunsen and his friends attempt to navigate through school life while outsmarting a student named Amanda who wants to rid society of Bunsen's kind.

The show is based on a drawing of a monster and a boy that Hartman created in 2009. He originally considered writing a picture book featuring the characters, but decided against going forward with the idea until an executive from Nickelodeon saw the drawing and encouraged him to develop the concept into a television program. Prominent themes highlighted in the series include the positive aspects of social integration and the celebration of different cultures. Bunsen Is a Beast was Hartman's fourth and final animated series produced for Nickelodeon before his departure with the network, after The Fairly OddParents (2001–2017), Danny Phantom (2004–2007), and T.U.F.F. Puppy (2010–2015). It is also his only animated series to not feature Grey Griffin or Rob Paulsen.

The first season, consisting of twenty-six episodes, was ordered by Nickelodeon in December 2015. The series had two runs on two different networks; Nickelodeon from January 16 to October 14, 2017, then Nicktoons from December 18, 2017, to February 10, 2018.

Premise
Bunsen Is a Beast centers around a blue monster named Bunsen, the first beast to attend Muckledunk Middle School. Mikey Munroe, his human friend, helps him navigate through school, as he feels the pressure to prove that monsters can coexist peacefully without eating and harming others. Episodes typically focus on Bunsen learning how to complete human tasks and discovering a human tradition. Mikey also learns more about the monster world, meeting new creatures whenever he visits Bunsen's home. However, a girl named Amanda Killman believes Bunsen is dangerous and wants to destroy him so that his kind will suffer from extinction. Bunsen and Mikey must outwit Amanda whenever she comes up with a new scheme, occasionally with the help of their friend, Darcy.

Characters

Main
 Bunsen Beast (voiced by Jeremy Rowley) - The titular character. He is a small beast who becomes friends with Mikey and is the first beast to become a student in a human school. Bunsen's body is colored cyan, light blue, and white, with magenta-colored lips, arms, and legs. He is very often seen with a dragon-like tail. Bunsen tends to act very childish, cute and fun-loving. He has two cousins named Charlene, a lhama with extra legs, and Bob, an abominable snowman.
 Mikey Morris Munroe (voiced by Ben Giroux) - Bunsen's best human friend and guide, who helps him navigate through life in Muckledunk. He attends Flap's class along with Amanda and deals with the troubles that arise between them. He has orange hair. In the original unaired pilot, Mikey was voiced by Maile Flanagan.
 Amanda Killman (voiced by Kari Wahlgren) - The main antagonist. Amanda is a self-proclaimed blossoming ingénue clad in a red, white, and blue schoolgirl uniform and Bunsen's nemesis. She is constantly scheming to get rid of Bunsen by trying to prove that beasts and humans can't coexist. Mikey, who stands in the way of this, has become her enemy, although she has a secret crush on him, as hinted in several episodes where she has made comments on him such as praising his tan and shorts. She likes boys in gym shorts, men in tanks and uniform, and her toys Princess Sassafrass and Queen Elizabear. She has a rich father who controls the school board, and can afford a water tower full of acne cream and bribes for townsfolk. She has a pet kitten named Doctor Revenge, who was given to her by Mikey and Bunsen. She has blonde hair, speaks with a lateral lisp and wears dental braces.

Recurring
 Beverly (voiced by Kari Wahlgren) - A chubby girl who is Amanda Killman's #1 henchman/second in command and seems to be willing to do anything Amanda commands. She is a preschooler, and, at times, is sometimes smarter than Amanda, sensing danger ahead as Amanda mostly ignores her.
 Darcy (voiced by Cristina Milizia) - A home-schooled and socially odd friend, who occasionally tags along with Bunsen and Mikey on their adventures.
 Wolfie (voiced by Kevin Michael Richardson) - An anthropomorphic wolf who is also Bunsen's best beast friend and Mikey's second best friend.
 Sophie Sanders (voiced by Kari Wahlgren) - A preening, flamboyant girl in Flap's class who speaks in a valley girl accent. Mikey has a crush on her, which might make her Amanda Killman's arch-rival for his affections.
 Mr. Munroe (voiced by Jeremy Rowley) - Mikey's dad.
 Mrs. Munroe (voiced by Kari Wahlgren) - Mikey's mom.
 Bunsen's Mom (voiced by Jennifer Hale) - An unnamed one-eyed octopus-like beast who is Bunsen's mother
 Bunsen's Dad (voiced by Jeff Bennett) - An unnamed bat-like beast who is Bunsen's father.

Minor
 Tooth Fairy (voiced by Tara Strong) - The jolly-happy fairy queen who gives money to children who have lost their teeth.
 Big Mikey (voiced by Jeff Bennett) - A wild black bear whom Bunsen meets and names after Mikey.
 Doctor Revenge - A kitten that Bunsen discovers and gives to Amanda Killman.
 Jerk Von Handsome (voiced by Jeremy Rowley) - A Swedish foreign exchange student who used to be Amanda's crush.
 Officer Steve Stevenson (voiced by Chris Hardwick) - A security guard at Muckledunk Museum. He first appeared in "Fright at the Museum" where Amanda tried to get him to bust Bunsen and Mikey, but failed when Steve saw that they not only didn't steal Uncle Funkle from his exhibit, but they put Aunt Rhoda back. He has braces like Amanda's.
 Malory - An Afro-American student in Flap's class.
 Commander Cone (voiced by Jerry Trainor) - A character who first appeared in "Bunsen Screams for Ice Cream" to help Amanda expel Bunsen from school by tempting him with his ice cream truck, but Mikey keeps Bunsen under control in the end. He reappears in "Astro-Nots", where Bunsen and Mikey see him in MASA and mistake him for a Mastronaut, so he gives them a tour, but accidentally launches them into space. In the end, Cone is no longer an ice cream vendor; he is a MASA Alien Space Defender. As noted several times, he pines for his ex-girlfriend Vanessa to return to him.
 Liz - Commander Cone's sister who did his laundry for him in her basement.
 Vanessa - Commander Cone's ex-girlfriend. According to Cone, she broke up with him on his birthday, Christmas Eve, after he became an ice cream vendor.
 Bog Beast (voiced by Ben Giroux) - A green Swamp creature who first appeared in "Unhappy Campers". Amanda mentioned him to Mikey in an attempt to scare him to cure her boredom. In the end, Mikey overcomes his fear of the Bog Beast, and the real deal discovers Amanda in the bog with him, terrifying her.
 Blog Beast - A beast who only terrifies people with his boring posts about what he had for lunch, which usually annoys Bunsen.
 Miss Flap (voiced by Cheri Oteri) -  Bunsen's teacher at Muckledunk Middle School.
 Hugging Chair - Bunsen's chair who first appeared in "Hug It Out'ch". At first, it trapped Amanda and wouldn't let her go, but in the end, Bunsen makes Amanda happy, and the chair releases her.
 Anti-Claus - A Santa Claus-like villain in which Amanda conspires with.
 Amazing Eric (voiced by Jeremy Rowley) – A magician who attends Flap's class.

Development 
The idea for Bunsen Is a Beast originated in a drawing of a monster facing a boy that Hartman drew in 2009. According to an article published in Variety, he kept the drawing in his office at Nickelodeon until a network executive noticed it and asked him to pitch the concept as a television show. The message that "no matter who you are, you can always find a place to fit in" inspired the show's underlying theme of embracing integration. Production of Bunsen is a Beast began in 2009 and ended in 2018. When asked in an interview with Heidi MacDonald's Comics Beat if the show could be interpreted as a metaphor for "accepting and befriending refugees," Hartman mentioned that the social commentary was "a little bit" intentional. Guy Moon, who previous worked with Hartman on his previous shows, composed the show's music. Animation began about a year before the show premiered.

Cancellation 
Butch Hartman announced the show's cancellation after a single season in a 2018 YouTube video in which he announced he had left Nickelodeon. The show is Hartman's shortest running series.

Episodes

Broadcast
A sneak peek of Bunsen Is a Beast was first shown at Comic-Con in 2016. The series has aired on YTV in Canada on June 3, 2017. The series premiered on Israel on June 4, 2017, Nickelodeon in Australia and New Zealand on June 5, 2017. The series premiered on Greece on July 15, 2017, and Nicktoons in the United Kingdom on September 4, 2017.

In France, the series first aired on Nickelodeon from 25 September 2017 to 30 November 2018, and had reruns on the free-to-air channel Gulli starting from 22 December 2018.

Reception

Critical
The show received positive reviews from critics. Robert Lloyd of the Los Angeles Times praised Bunsen Is a Beast in his review, likening it to "an early Hanna-Barbera cartoon with the engine of Tex Avery at his eye-popping extreme" and commending its message about embracing outsiders as "particularly timely."

Emily Ashby of Common Sense Media gave the series 3 out of 5 stars; saying that, "This series has an admirable premise that's illustrated by a surprising friendship, but the show's more irritating elements can overshadow its better points." But added that, "kids will like the show's over-the-top situations and Bunsen's bizarre reactions to them."

Accolades

References

External links

 
  on Nickelodeon

Nicktoons
2010s American animated television series
2010s American school television series
2010s Nickelodeon original programming
2017 American television series debuts
2017 animated television series debuts
2018 American television series endings
American children's animated comedy television series
American children's animated fantasy television series
American flash animated television series
Animated television series about children
English-language television shows
Middle school television series
Animated television series about monsters
Television series created by Butch Hartman
YTV (Canadian TV channel) original programming